James Wallace Black (February 10, 1825 – January 5, 1896), known professionally as J.W. Black,  was an early American photographer whose career was marked by experimentation and innovation.

Biography
He was born on February 10, 1825, in Francestown, New Hampshire.

After trying his luck as a painter in Boston, he turned to photography, beginning as a daguerreotype plate polisher. He soon partnered with John Adams Whipple, a prolific Boston photographer and inventor. Black's photograph of abolitionist John Brown in 1859, the year of his insurrection at Harpers Ferry, is now in the National Portrait Gallery, Smithsonian Institution.

In March 1860, Black took a photograph of poet Walt Whitman when Whitman was in Boston to oversee the typesetting of his 1860 edition of Leaves of Grass. Black's studio at 173 Washington Street was less than a block from the publishing firm of Thayer and Eldridge, who apparently commissioned the photograph to promote the 1860 edition.

On October 13, 1860, two years after the French photographer Nadar conducted his earliest experiments in balloon flight, Black made the first successful aerial photographs in the United States in collaboration with the balloon navigator Samuel Archer King on King's hot-air balloon, the Queen of the Air. He photographed Boston from a hot-air balloon at 1,200 feet (8 plates of glass negative; 10 1/16 x 7 15/16 in). One good print resulted, which the photographer entitled Boston, as the Eagle and the Wild Goose See It. This was the first clear aerial image of a city.

Almost immediately, aerial reconnaissance would be put to use by the Union and Confederate Armies during the American Civil War, though there is no credible evidence that aerial photography was successful.

Black later became the authority on the use of the magic lantern, a candlelight-powered projector that was a predecessor of today's slide projectors. By the late 1870s Black's business largely consisted of lantern slide production, including his famous images of the Great Boston Fire of 1872, published a photographic album titled Ruins of the Great Fire in Boston, November 1872.

He died on January 5, 1896, and was buried in Mount Auburn Cemetery in Cambridge, Massachusetts.

Collections of his work
 Boston Athenaeum
 Boston Public Library
 George Eastman House
 Historic New England
 Massachusetts Historical Society
 Metropolitan Museum of Art, New York City

References

Further reading

 In Memoriam: JW Black. Wilsons Photographic Magazine, March 1896
 Encyclopedia of nineteenth-century photography, Volume 1. CRC Press, 2008.

External links

 Boston Public Library on Flickr. James Wallace Black Photographs
 Cambridge Historical Society on Flickr

Image gallery

American portrait photographers
1825 births
1896 deaths
Photographers from Massachusetts
Artists from Boston
Burials at Mount Auburn Cemetery
19th century in Boston
19th-century American photographers